Shopping neutral is the term given to the shopping trend whereby consumers offset almost all of their spending by making money from selling goods online. The trend was identified amongst users of eBay.co.uk, based on analysis of over 100 million online transactions during 2007-2008.

Researchers at  eBay documented the Shopping Neutral trend in the 2008 eBaynomics 1 report, which identified the activity of a growing number of users who bought and sold on the site within a 10% value range.

eBay identified 51,000 neutral shoppers in the UK at the end of 2007, an increase of 5% on the previous year. The researchers predicted 10% growth in this number by the end of 2008. The East Midlands town of Coalville is the Shopping Neutral capital of the UK.

1The eBaynomics Report analysis is based on 2007 transactions in key categories across the following UK cities: Aberdeen; Birmingham; Bradford; Brighton; Bristol; Cardiff; Derby; Edinburgh; Glasgow; Leeds; Leicester; Liverpool; London; Luton; Manchester; Middlesbrough; Newcastle; Norwich; Nottingham; Sheffield; Stockport; Stoke-on-Trent; Swansea; Wolverhampton.

References 

Consumer behaviour